Williamsburg is a small unincorporated community in Greenbrier County, West Virginia, United States. Williamsburg has a post office with ZIP code 24991.

The community derives its name from Albert Williams, a local pioneer.

References

Unincorporated communities in Greenbrier County, West Virginia
Unincorporated communities in West Virginia